Robert Wendel is an American composer of classical music.

Biography
Robert Wendel was born in Bridgeport, Connecticut in 1951, Robert Wendel showed an early talent for music as a piano student, however, small hands and a broken left wrist redirected his musical interests towards conducting and composing/arranging when he attended the University of Connecticut double majoring in chemistry and music. While at the university, Robert studied with Hale Smith and privately with Leroy Anderson. He also served as assistant conductor of both the University of Connecticut Symphony and the New Britain Symphony. After receiving his Master of Arts degree, Robert immersed himself in musical theater for several years before he moved to New York City and became an orchestra member and stand-by conductor at Radio City Music Hall under Don Pippin, and conductor/arranger for Carol Channing and touring with The Pirates of Penzance and Evita.

In 1990 while still touring with stars and shows, ending up with an international tour and PBS telecast as conductor for Harry Connick, Jr., Robert started his own publishing/musical rental business, "Robert Wendel Music." His first major arrangement was "A Classical Christmas Suite"  and a steady stream of arrangements and new pops works, as well as lighter and more accessible classical works followed and continues to this day. He has been performed in 14 countries, has had multiple broadcasts, and his work appears on several albums for Telarc, Naxos, ABC Classics, and others. Live performances and broadcasts have included the Cincinnati Pops, New York Pops, Philly Pops, Atlanta, Houston, Baltimore, Cleveland, St. Louis, Dallas, Seattle, Flint, National, BBC, Royal Scottish National, Tasmanian, Bochum, Toronto, Edmonton, and many other orchestras, under conductors Erich Kunzel, Steven Reineke, Michael Krajewski, David Charles Abell, John Morris Russell, Enrique Diemecke, Sean O'Boyle, Carl Topilow, and many others.

His work has been featured every December since 2001 on the annual "Flint Symphony Orchestra Holiday Pops" telecast on WJRT-TV 12, at a memorial concert for the Challenger astronauts at The Kennedy Space Center, at a concert to honor the Tuskegee Airmen, and featured on the 2006 National Memorial Day Concert to honor the opening of the National World War II Memorial telecast live nationwide on PBS, and in 2009 as part of the Abraham Lincoln tribute, and again in 2011 for Gen. Colin Powell's welcome home to our troops on the National Mall, and yet again in 2017 it was featured to salute The Tuskegee Airmen and World War 2 veterans.

As publisher "Robert Wendel Music" represents works by Tracey Rush, Nancy Bloomer Deussen, Leroy Anderson, Jerry Herman, Christopher Tyler Nickel, and others.

Work
Wendel's music is firmly rooted in tonality, melody, and the more classic pops sound of Leroy Anderson, Robert Russell Bennett, Richard Hayman, and Jack Mason, with influences from Ralph Vaughan Williams and Alan Hovhaness. His output is focused on holidays, Americana/patriotic, comedy, and works for children and educational concerts. He has also written for "Cirque de la Symphonie".

Among his most notable and frequently performed works are his "Classical Christmas Suite" which revisits 5 Christmas Carols as if they were written by 4 classical composers, "Coventry Carol" as if it were written by Vaughan Williams, "Christmas a la Valse", and his originals: "Fanfare For Freedom, " "Commemoration, " and "Ride of the Headless Horseman." "Fanfare For Freedom" has had the distinction of being the opening selection at the Atlanta Symphony's 4 July concerts for 7 years in a row, and "Commemoration" was featured on a 7 city tour by Erich Kunzel and the Cincinnati Pops following the 9-11 tragedy.

Works list

In December 2014, Robert Wendel was awarded The American Prize Judge's Special Citation for "Music for Use. Well Crafted, Accessible and Performance-Ready."
Robert received The American Prize as one of five "Honored Artists" for 2015.

Orchestral
"Fanfare For Freedom" (1994)
Premiered by the Atlanta Symphony
"The Tall Ships" (1999)
Premiered by the Tasmanian Symphony Orchestra
"Commemoration" (2000)
Broadcast premiere by the National Symphony Orchestra
"Parade of the Percussionists" (2000)
Premiered by the Hilo Philharmonic
"Ride of the Headless Horseman" (2001) - from "A Halloween Trilogy"
 Premiered by The Queensland Symphony Orchestra
"Take Flight" (2003)
Premiered by the Columbus Symphony Orchestra
"The Pit and the Pendulum" (2004) - from "A Halloween Trilogy"
Premiered by the Chicago Civic Symphony
"Towers of Light" (2006)
Premiered by The Atlanta Symphony Youth Orchestra
Named a finalist in the first "American Prize" in Orchestral Composition
"Trick Or Treat" (2006) - from "A Halloween Trilogy"
Premiered by the Hilton Head Orchestra
"Meditation" (2008)
Premiered by the University of Wyoming Symphony
"Fanfare: Welcome Home" (2010)
Premiered by the Gulf Coast Symphony
"Caribbean Sleigh Ride" (2010)
Premiered by The Orlando Philharmonic Orchestra
"The Wolf Was Framed!" (2011)
Premiered by the Cherokee Symphony, Lee Thorson conductor.
"The Poltergeist Polka" (2011)
Premiered by the Dayton Philharmonic Orchestra
"The Nativity Bells" (After Byrd) (2013)
Premiered by The Atlanta Symphony

Vocal
"Christmas Through Children's Eyes" (2001)
Lyrics by Vince Trani
"Santa Dear" (2002)
Lyrics by Vince Trani and Robert Wendel
"The Bells of Christmas" (2003)
Lyrics by Vince Trani
"Virginia, 1861" (2011) - For the sesquicentennial of the Civil War.
for S.A.T.B. choir, boys choir and orchestra from texts by Melville, and Joyce.
"It Wouldn't Be Christmas Without you" (2011)
Lyrics by Vince Trani
Premiered by the Arkansas Symphony
"This Is Chanukah" (2013)
Co-Premiered by The Philly Pops and The University of Wyoming Symphony and chorus. 
Named a finalist for the 2014 "American Prize for Choral Composition."
"Holiday Greetings" (2014)
 Premiered by David Charles Abell conducting The Philly Pops, Festival Chorus, and Philadelphia Boys Choir.
 Named a finalist for the 2015 "American Prize in Choral Composition."
"Ring Out Bells, Ring!" (2017)
 Premiered by Jeffrey R. Smith conducting The Philly Pops and Philadelphia Boys Choir.

Arrangements
"The Armed Forces March" (1998)
"April Fool Concerto" (1994/2002)
"Back to the Fifties" (1999)
"Bali il Tarantella" (2009)
"Baroque Festival Overture" (2007)
"The Best Christmas of All" (1997)
"Carol of the Bells" (1998)
"Chanukah Overture" (1995)
"Christmas a la Valse!" (1995)
"Coventry Carol" (1995)
"An Evergreen Christmas" (2000)
"Fiesta Mexicana" (1991)
"The Flintstones Meets The Jetsons" (1994)
"From Sea To Shining Sea" (1993/1995)
"A George M. Cohan Overture." (1994)
"Good King Wenceslas (After Tchaikovsky 6th Symphony) (2018)
"In The Manger" (1998)
"An Irish Trilogy" (1998)
"Jingle Fourth" (1990) - From "A Classical Christmas Suite"
"Jonny Quest March" (2005)
"Little Bolero Boy" (1990) - From "A Classical Christmas Suite" Also known as The Little Drummer Boy (Bolero)
"A Merry Christmas Sing-Along" (2012)
"Meditation" (2006)
"An Old Fashioned Summer" (1998)
"The Orange Blossom Special" (1996)
"Orfeo's Rockatta" (2001)
"The Original Ragtime Band" (1995)
"O Holy Night (After Massenet - Thais)" - (2017)
"Overture to a Merry Christmas" (1990) - From "A Classical Christmas Suite"
"Protest And Hope" (1997)
"Raymond Scott Music" (1993–1997)
Includes "Powerhouse, Dinner Music for a Pack of Hungry Cannibals, Huckleberry Duck, The Penguin, The Toy Trumpet, Twilight in Turkey." Available through G. Schirmer
"Rock Around The Clock" (1995)
"The Rocky Horror Picture Show" (2000)
"Saint Bailey's Rag" (1991)
"The Saint Louis Blues" (1994)
"The Smurf's March" (2005)
"A Stephen Foster Overture" (1992)
"Still, Still, Still" (2010)
"Surf's Up!" (1993)
"Swing Ludwig, Swing!" (1999)
"That's It, That's All... The End!" (2004)
"Under The Big Top" (2006)
"Viva Puccini" (1997)
"We Need A Little Christmas" (1996)
"We Three Kings..." (1990) - From "A Classical Christmas Suite"
"When TV Was Young" (1999)

Edited Symphonic Performing Editions
"Overture from Goldilocks" by Leroy Anderson
"Overture from Hello Dolly" by Jerry Herman
"Overture from La Cage Aux Folles" by Jerry Herman
"Overture from Mack And Mabel" by Jerry Herman
"Overture from Mame" by Jerry Herman
"Overture from Milk And Honey" by Jerry Herman
"This Lovely World" from "Gone with the Wind" by Leroy Anderson and Ogden Nash

Discography
 American Reflections Catalog No: RWM001
 Christmas Old And New Catalog No: RWM002
 Christmastime Is Here Telarc - "Little Bolero Boy" and "We Need A Little Christmas"
 Commemoration ABC - Catalog No:4767929
 Christmas a la Valse Houston Symphony Society - Catalog No: B0000EI98P

References

External links
"The American Prize"
"Raymond Scott arrangements"
"Leroy Anderson Music for hire."
Selections on YouTube

American male classical composers
American classical composers
20th-century classical composers
21st-century classical composers
1951 births
University of Connecticut alumni
Musicians from Bridgeport, Connecticut
Light music composers
Living people
Date of birth missing (living people)
21st-century American composers
20th-century American composers
20th-century American male musicians
21st-century American male musicians